The Canton Public Library is a historic Carnegie library building in Canton, Ohio, United States. It was designed by Guy Tilden as the winning entry in a Carnegie library design competition. The library was built in 1903. It was said in 1973 to be "'one of Tilden's designs most admired by present-day architects'" The library moved to another building in 1978, and the original building now houses law offices.

It was listed on the National Register of Historic Places in 1982.

References

Library buildings completed in 1903
Buildings and structures in Canton, Ohio
Libraries on the National Register of Historic Places in Ohio
National Register of Historic Places in Stark County, Ohio